Pavitra Bandhan – Do Dilon Ka (English: Sacred Bond - Of Two Hearts) is an Indian soap opera created by Ekta Kapoor under her banner Balaji Telefilms and co-produced by Ekta Kapoor and Shobha Kapoor. The show aired every Monday to Friday at 8:30 PM on DD National. Yash Tonk and Hritu Dudhani play the protagonists.

Plot
The show is a romantic drama series that revolves around the protagonists Girish and Aashima who, under unreliable circumstances, marry each other but eventually fall in love. The show explores the other dramas of their families and children. After some misunderstandings which culminate to a divorce, the two unite again. During that time, Aashima becomes pregnant, but because Girish knows that Sameer (Girish's cousin) also has feelings for Aashima, he suspects it is Sameer's child and begins to hate Aashima. In the end, she decides to leave him, but when she does, she has an accident and loses her eyesight.

The show then takes a seven-year leap.

After the leap, the show starts with a new entry, seven-year-old Sahil (Sanay Somaiya), who is actually the son of Aashima and Girish. Girish is unaware of all this. The show explores how Sahil gets Aashima and Girish back together.

Cast
 Yash Tonk as Girish Roy Choudhary
 Hritu Dudani as Aashima Roy Choudhary
 Sanay Somaiya as Sahil Roy Choudhary child artist 
 Yamini Thakur as Chandra Rajkumar
 Muni Jha
 Rujut Dahiya as Vikram
 Resha Konkar as Shibani
 Shailley Kaushik
 Shalini Arora
 Madan Joshi
 Manmohan Tiwari as Rajkumar 
 Sahil Uppal as Aarav Seth
 Ashima Ahmed as Gehna Aarav Seth
 Preet Singh as Deb Roy Choudhary
 Leesha Bhalerao as Pakhi
 Aakash Talwar as Sameer Basu
 Ekta Methai as young Shonali Roy Choudhary
 Drishti Hemdev as young Mishti Roy Choudhary
 Chahat Pandey as Mishti Roy Choudhary
 Fahad Ali as Mayank
 Anjali singh as Tapasya

References

External links
 
 Official Page at DD National
 Official Page at Balajitelefilms.com

Balaji Telefilms television series
DD National original programming
Indian television soap operas
2013 Indian television series debuts